Sacri may refer to :

The Sacri Monti of Piedmont and Lombardy are a series of nine groups of chapels and other architectural features  in northern Italy.
Anni sacri (March 12, 1950),is an encyclical of Pope Pius XII issued on the twelfth anniversary of his coronation.
The Quattro pezzi sacri or 4 sacred pieces is a compilation of vocal works by Giuseppe Verdi.